Alberto Pérez Zabala (6 April 1925 – 7 August 2014) was a Spanish professional footballer who played as a goalkeeper.

Career
Born in Bilbao, Pérez played for Athletic Bilbao, Arenas Club, Atlético Madrid, Sporting de Gijón and Laudio.

Later life and death
After retiring as a player Pérez worked for the Banco de Vizcaya; he died on 7 August 2014.

References

1925 births
2014 deaths
Spanish footballers
Athletic Bilbao footballers
Arenas Club de Getxo footballers
Atlético Madrid footballers
Sporting de Gijón players
CD Laudio players
La Liga players
Association football goalkeepers